There are perhaps three hundred sign languages in use around the world today. The number is not known with any confidence; new sign languages emerge frequently through creolization and de novo (and occasionally through language planning). In some countries, such as Sri Lanka and Tanzania, each school for the deaf may have a separate language, known only to its students and sometimes denied by the school; on the other hand, countries may share sign languages, although sometimes under different names (Croatian and Serbian, Indian and Pakistani). Deaf sign languages also arise outside educational institutions, especially in village communities with high levels of congenital deafness, but there are significant sign languages developed for the hearing as well, such as the speech-taboo languages used in aboriginal Australia.  Scholars are doing field surveys to identify the world's sign languages.

The following list is grouped into three sections :

 Deaf sign languages, which are the preferred languages of Deaf communities around the world; these include village sign languages, shared with the hearing community, and Deaf-community sign languages
 Auxiliary sign languages, which are not native languages but sign systems of varying complexity, used alongside spoken languages. Simple gestures are not included, as they do not constitute language.
 Signed modes of spoken languages, also known as manually coded languages, which are bridges between signed and spoken languages

The list of deaf sign languages is sorted regionally and alphabetically, and such groupings should not be taken to imply any genetic relationships between these languages (see List of language families).

Sign language list

Contemporary deaf sign languages

Africa
There are at least 25 sign languages in Africa, according to researcher Nobutaka Kamei. Some have distributions that are completely independent of those of African spoken languages. At least 13 foreign sign languages, mainly from Europe and America, have been introduced to at least 27 African nations; some of the 23 sign languages documented by Kamei have originated with or been influenced by them.

Americas

Asia-Pacific

Europe

Middle East

Historical deaf sign languages 
 Martha's Vineyard Sign Language
 Old French Sign Language – ancestral to the French family
 Old Kent Sign Language

Auxiliary sign languages
 Baby Sign – using signs to assist early language development in young children.
 Contact Sign – a pidgin or contact language between a spoken language and a sign language, e.g. Pidgin Sign English (PSE).
 Curwin Hand Signs – a technique which allows musical notes to be communicated through hand signs.
 International Sign (previously known as Gestuno) – an auxiliary language used by deaf people in international settings.
 Makaton – a system of signed communication used by and with people who have speech, language or learning difficulties.
 Mofu-Gudur Sign Language
 Monastic sign language
 Signalong – international sign assisted communication techniques used to support children and adults with communication or learning difficulties

Manual modes of spoken languages

Manual modes of spoken languages include:

 General
 Cued Speech – a hand/mouth system (HMS) to render spoken language phonemes visually intelligible.
 Fingerspelling – alphabetic signs to represent the written form of a spoken language.
 English
 Manually Coded English
 Signing Exact English (SEE2)
Makaton
Malay
 Bahasa Malaysia Kod Tangan (BMKT)
Speech-taboo languages
 Caucasian Sign Language
 Australian Aboriginal sign languages (though Yolŋu Sign Language does not correspond to any one language, and doubles as a language of the deaf)

Genetic classification of sign languages

Languages are assigned families (implying a genetic relationships between these languages) as British, Swedish (perhaps a branch of BSL), French (with branches ASL (American), Austro-Hungarian, Danish, Italian), German, Japanese, and language isolates.

See also
 Contact sign
 Intercultural competence
 Legal recognition of sign languages
 List of sign languages by number of native signers
 Manual alphabet
 Sign language
 World Federation of the Deaf

References

External links
Ethnologue – Deaf sign languages
Multiple accessible sign languages dictionaries
Signes du Monde, directory for all online Sign Languages dictionaries 

Sign
Deaf education